MartianCraft is an American-based software company. The company has launched mobile and Mac apps such as Briefs and TouchPad. Rob Rhyne and Jeff LaMarche founded the company in 2009.

History
MartianCraft's Briefs app was first discussed in 2010, following its development and submission to the Apple iOS App Store. The app was quickly compared to other apps, such as Google Voice that have had their app under review for a number of months by Apple's review team. The app left MartianCraft's app in limbo for the foreseeable future.

In 2013, MartianCraft launched their Briefs app. Briefs was initially launched as an iOS app in May 2013, and the tool was created for prototyping iOS apps. Macworld featured the app explaining that while the app wasn't for programming apps, explaining that it was therefore not a direct competitor to Apple's Xcode.

At the time of release, Briefs was said to cost $199 and allowed the user to develop a working prototype of their app.

Gizmodo featured MartianCraft writing on their blog about Apple's design changes when they launched OS X Yosemite. The analysis predominantly covered the icon changes Apple had made to their operating system.

In February 2014, it was stated on Storify that the consultancy firm, Empirical Development were to merge. Following the announcement, one of the founders of Empirical Development featured in Fast Company, discussing the legacy app updates for iOS7. Later that month, MartianCraft acquired BitBQ, who were in control of the TouchPad and NumPad apps.

TouchPad was then redesigned for iOS7 in 2014. The redesign came on the popular app, which was acquired by MartianCraft years earlier.

Later in 2014, MartianCraft acquired the Denver-based software developer, Dragon Forged Software, which was founded in 2004. The software company had primarily focused on developing Apple-based software before their acquisition. MartianCraft therefore took over the control of Slender, Resolve, and Trivium. The final acquisition of 2014, came when Zarra Studios was acquired by MartianCraft.

MartianCraft was named to the Inc. 5000 list as a fastest growing private company in 2015, 2016, and again in 2017.

Briefs
Following its release, Briefs was analysed by Fast Company. Briefs was put on hold by MartianCraft for nearly 3 years. After working on other projects, the app was accepted by Apple in 2013. While the project was delayed for a number of years, the creator stated that the delay had made the app better.

It was stated that when Briefs was designed, it didn't want to affect the existing workflow, it would rather add to it. Briefs would be able to sit alongside tools designers and developers already use. The app was said to have taken influences from Final Cut Pro, Adobe Photoshop and also Adobe Illustrator.

Briefs had an overall positive reception when it was released. The app was rated by Macworld 4 out of 5 in their official review.

Publications
Many members of staff of MartianCraft have written or been quoted in numerous publications. These have included Jeff LaMarche, Alan Bradburne, Kyle Richter, Joe Keeley, Dave Wood, Matt Henderson, Cory Bohon, Marcus Zarra, Kirby Turner, Michael Hay and Eric Blair. The majority of their publication coverage has been as authors, co-authors or technical reviewers.

External links
 MartianCraft Official Website

References

Software companies of the United States
2009 establishments in Virginia
Software companies established in 2009